Ska Studios is an independent game development studio founded by James Silva in 2007 after winning a contract to publish The Dishwasher: Dead Samurai to Xbox Live Arcade. Ska Studios has released four Metacritic-aggregated console games since then, more than any similarly sized studio. Ska Studios currently consists of James Silva.

The studio is well known in indie gaming for its art style, which is described as cartoonish, grim, and gory, and its games' tight controls. Many of the studio's games are strongly inspired by modern action titles, such as Devil May Cry, Ninja Gaiden Black, and Dark Souls.

Games

History 
James Silva began making games as a hobby in 2001, starting with Zombie Smashers X, a River City Ransom style beat-em'-up game, but the title was financially unsuccessful, selling fewer than 100 units. James went on to develop more similarly unsuccessful titles, including Blood Zero, Zombie Smashers X2, and Survival Crisis Z, but didn't achieve viable commercial success until 8 years later, with 2009's The Dishwasher: Dead Samurai.

Development 
All of Ska Studios' currently released games are built using the XNA framework or its open-source cross platform counterpart, MonoGame. When Xbox One launched with no XNA support, Ska Studios made the switch to PlayStation 4, with Salt and Sanctuary being the studio's first title to launch on a non-Microsoft console. Regarding the change, James said:"The engineering side of it was an issue. All of our code is .NET/XNA, and, even though XNA support has ended, .NET games can use open source wrappers like MonoGame and FNA to carry the torch. But Xbox One has no .NET support. PS4 does, with titles like Towerfall: Ascension and Transistor using MonoGame in one form or another to deploy to PS4."

References

External links 
 

Video game companies established in 2007
Video game companies of the United States
Video game development companies
Companies based in Seattle
2007 establishments in Washington (state)
Indie video game developers